Qaraçuxur (also spelled as, Gharachukhur, Imeni Kaganovicha, Kaganovich, Kaganovicha, Karachekhur, Karachukhur, Posëlok Imeni Kaganovicha, Serebovski, and Serebrovskiy) is a settlement and municipality in Baku, Azerbaijan. It has a population of 77,619. The municipality consists of the settlements of Qaraçuxur.

There are 7 secondary schools, 1 gymnasium, 1 dental polyclinic, 1 medical unit and 1 hospital in the settlement.

References 

Populated places in Baku